Sar Takht is a village in Torud Rural District, in the Central District of Shahrud County, Semnan Province, Iran. At the 2006 census, its population was 83, in 17 families.

References 

Populated places in Shahrud County